Bethlehemites, or Bethlemites is the name of five Catholic religious orders.

It may also refer to:
Inhabitants of Bethlehem
Hussites of Bohemia are sometimes called "Bethlehemites"
Inmates of Bethlem Royal Hospital or, colloquially, of madmen in general